Mary Jane Irwin is an Emerita Evan Pugh Professor in the Department of Computer Science and Engineering at Pennsylvania State University. She has been on the faculty at Penn State since 1977. She is an international expert in computer architecture. Her research and teaching interests include computer architecture, embedded and mobile computing systems design, power and reliability aware design, and emerging technologies in computing systems.

Irwin was elected a member of the National Academy of Engineering in 2003 for contributions to VLSI architecture and automated design.

Biography

Education
Mary Jane Irwin received her B.S. in Mathematics from Memphis State University in 1971, and her M.S. and Ph.D. in Computer Science from the University of Illinois in 1975 and 1977, respectively.  Her dissertation research on the topic of computer arithmetic was supervised by Dr. James Robertson.

Career
Mary Jane Irwin joined the faculty of the Pennsylvania State University as an assistant professor in 1977. She was promoted to the rank of full professor in 1989.   She retired in 2017.

Irwin has worked in the area of application-specific
architectures, including the design, implementation, and field-testing of three different board level designs---the Arithmetic Cube, the MGAP and SPARTA.  With her student
Robert M. Owens they developed a suite of architecture, logic and circuit design
tools including ARTIST, PERFLEX, LOGICIAN, and DECOMPOSER.

In late 1993, Irwin worked in the area of resource constrained systems design including embedded systems that have limited battery life and limited memory space and sensor network systems that have extremely limited resources.  With colleagues she developed an architectural level power simulator, SimplePower.

Irwin's recent work is in mixed technology circuits.

On October 1, 2019 the IEEE CEDA and ESD Alliance announced that Mary Jane Irwin will receive the 2019 Phil Kaufman Award, the EDA Industry's highest honor. She will be the first woman to receive the award.

Service to the Computing Community

Irwin has extensive service to the Computer Science research community.  She is a member of the Board on Army Science and Technology, of ACM's Fellows Selection Committee, of Microsoft Research's External Research Advisory Board, and of NAE's Committee on Membership (Chair for the Class of 2012). Previously she served as a founding co-Editor-in-Chief of ACM's Journal on Emerging Technologies in Computing Systems and as Editor-in-Chief of ACM's Transactions on the Design Automation of Electronic Systems, as an elected member of the CRA's Board of Directors, of the IEEE Computer Society's Board of Governors, of ACM's Council, and as Vice President of ACM.  She was also a long-time board member of CRA-W, the CRA's Committee on the Status of Women, where she is now a member emerita.

Personal life

Mary Jane Irwin was married in July 1966.  She and her husband of 55 years have one son, John, who is also a computer scientist, and two grandchildren, Kai and Milo.

Honors and awards
 2021 The CRA A. Nico Habermann Award
 Irwin received an Honorary Doctorate from Chalmers University, Sweden.
 2019 Phil Kaufman Award of the Electronic System Design Alliance and the IEEE Council on Electronic Design Automation
 2012 ASP-DAC Ten-Year Retrospective Most Influential Paper Award
 2010 The ACM Athena Lecturer Award, ACM, having been separately nominated by both the Computer Architecture and the Design Automation research communities.
 2009 inducted into the American Academy of Arts and Sciences AAAS
 2007 Anita Borg Technical Leadership Award
 2006 Computing Research Association (CRA) Distinguished Service Award
 2005 ACM Distinguished Service Award
 2004 Marie R. Pistilli Women in Electronic Design Automation Award
 2003 IEEE/CAS VLSI Transactions Best Paper of the Year Award
 2003 inducted into the NAE
 1996 ACM Fellow
 1994 IEEE Fellow

References

External links
 Home Page

University of Memphis alumni
University of Illinois alumni
Fellows of the Association for Computing Machinery
Pennsylvania State University faculty
American women computer scientists
American computer scientists
Year of birth missing (living people)
Living people
Fellow Members of the IEEE
Members of the United States National Academy of Engineering
Fellows of the American Association for the Advancement of Science
Fellows of the American Academy of Arts and Sciences
Electronic engineering award winners
American women academics